The Union of Popular Movements (UMP)  was the main Christian democratic faction of Forza Italia political party. Its leader is Gianfranco Rotondi, who was a member of the disbanded Christian Democracy and than a loyalist of the former Prime Minister Silvio Berlusconi.

History

The faction was founded in 2014 by Rotondi and many Christian democrats and conservatives deputies of FI; Rotondi who want start a Shadow Cabinet (Governo Ombra) opposite to Renzi Cabinet and he is well-supported by the lot Christian democrats of Forza Italia, first of all Raffaele Fitto.

After the Fitto and Rotondi's split from Forza Italia in July 2015, the UMP was destablished.

References

2014 establishments in Italy
Politics of Italy